Beta lomatogona is a species of wild beet in the family Amaranthaceae, native to Cyprus, Turkey, the Transcaucasus, and Iran. A diploid, it is being studied for its cold and drought resistance in an effort to improve the sugar beet.

References

lomatogona
Flora of Cyprus
Flora of Turkey
Flora of the Transcaucasus
Flora of Iran
Plants described in 1838